This is a list of links to articles on software used to manage Portable Document Format (PDF) documents. The distinction between the various functions is not entirely clear-cut; for example, some viewers allow adding of annotations, signatures, etc. Some software allows redaction, removing content irreversibly for security. Extracting embedded text is a common feature, but other applications perform optical character recognition (OCR) to convert imaged text to machine-readable form, sometimes by using an external OCR module.

Terminology
Creators – to allow users to convert other file formats to PDF.
Readers – to allow users to open, read and print PDF files.
Editors – to allow users to edit or otherwise modify PDF files.
Converters – to allow users to convert PDF files to other formats.

Multi-platform

Development libraries
These are used by software developers to add and create PDF features.

Creators
These create files in their native formats, but then allow users to export them to PDF formats.

Viewers

These allow users to view (not edit or modify) any existing PDF file.

AmigaOS

Converters
 Antiword: A free Microsoft Office Word reader for various operating systems; converts binary files from Word 2, 6, 7, 97, 2000, 2002 and 2003 to plain text or PostScript; available for AmigaOS 4, MorphOS, AROS x86
 dvipdfm: a DVI to PDF translator with zlib support

Viewers
 Xpdf: a multi-platform viewer for PDF files, Amiga version uses X11 engine Cygnix.

Linux and Unix

Converters 
 Collabora Online can be used as a web application, a command line tool, or a Java/Python library. Supported formats include OpenDocument, PDF, HTML, Microsoft Office formats (DOC/DOCX/RTF, XLS/XLSX, PPT/PPTX) and others.

Creators, Editors and Viewers

macOS

Converters
 deskUNPDF for Mac: proprietary application from Docudesk to convert PDF files to Microsoft Office, LibreOffice, image, and data file formats

Creators 
 macOS: Creates PDF documents natively via print dialog

Editors
 Adobe Acrobat: Proprietary PDF authoring suite
 PDF Expert: Proprietary PDF viewer and editor. 
 PDF Studio: Proprietary software to view and edit PDF documents. 
 PDF Signer: Proprietary; fills forms and embeds image signatures in PDF documents

Viewers
 Safari: This bundled web browser has built-in support for reading PDF documents.
 Firefox: Includes a PDF viewer
 Google Chrome: Includes a PDF viewer
 Preview: macOS's default PDF viewer; in Mac OS X v10.5 and later, it also can rotate, reorder, annotate, insert, and delete pages. It can also merge files, create new files from existing files, and move pages between files
 Adobe Reader: Adobe Systems's reader which is also available for Macintosh; Safari plug-in available
 Skim, an open-source (BSD licence) PDF reader and note-taker for macOS
 Foxit Reader: Proprietary, freeware.  Allows users to add elements to PDFs (e.g. arrowed comment boxes, text boxes, links, bookmarks, and images)
 Javelin3 PDF Reader: Proprietary, freeware, A full functionality PDF reader with support for DRM using encoded and encrypted PDF files in Drumlin's DRMX and DRMZ formats

Microsoft Windows

Converters
 Adobe Acrobat: Can convert files into PDF or convert PDF files into other formats
 ABBYY FineReader: Commercial PDF converter which converts PDF into Word (.doc), Excel (.xls), PowerPoint (ppt), and more
 deskUNPDF: PDF converter to convert PDFs to Word (.doc, docx), Excel (.xls), (.csv), (.txt), more
 GSview: File:Convert menu item converts any sequence of PDF pages to a sequence of images in many formats from bit to tiffpack with resolutions from 72 to 204 × 98 (open source software)
 Google Chrome: convert HTML to PDF using Print > Save as PDF.
 gDoc Fusion: Proprietary, shareware; PDF views, edits, converts documents into PDF, XPS or Microsoft Word document; after 30 days a watermark is placed on documents in shareware version
 OmniPage: Converts to and from PDF and other formats with many options.
 Nitro PDF Reader: (Freeware) Extracts Images in original resolution.
 PDF-XChange: PDF Tools and PDF-XChange print driver allow conversion from many formats to PDF. A "lite" version of the print driver is free for non-commercial (home and academic) but places a watermark on documents
 Qiqqa: Converts Microsoft Word document and Web Pages to PDF.
 SWFTools: 'pdf2swf component converts PDF to SWF – command line with GUI wrapper
 poppler-utils a collection of tools builds on poppler to convert PDF contents to everything
 GraphicsMagick: Can convert PDF to PNG or other formats.

Creators

Editors

Viewers
 ABBYY FineReader PDF Viewer
 Adobe Reader: Adobe's PDF reader is free for personal use.
 Evince: a free (GPL), open source PDF reader. Part of the GNOME desktop environment. A Windows port was available from version 2.28 to version 2.32.
 Foxit Reader: Proprietary/freeware PDF reader, supports FDF import/export, saving filled forms; other extended functionality available via purchasable plugins.
 gDoc Fusion: Proprietary/shareware to view PDF, XPS, Microsoft Word document, Microsoft Excel spreadsheet, Microsoft PowerPoint presentation or image files, included in the evaluation version of the product. Shareware version places a watermark on documents after 30-day eval.
 Google Chrome: Includes a PDF viewer.
 GSview: Open source software and Ghostscript's viewer for Windows.
 Microsoft Edge: Includes a PDF viewer.
 Microsoft Reader: A discontinued PDF viewer in Windows 8.1.
 Mozilla Firefox: Includes a PDF viewer.
 MuPDF: Free lightweight document viewer.
 Nitro PDF Reader: Freeware (though proprietary) PDF reader and creator. Supports three methods (specifying the file within the reader's interface, or dragging-'n-dropping a file onto the reader's Windows desktop icon, or "printing" to a virtual printer driver) of PDF creation (Ghostscript not additionally needed), saving filled forms (AcroForms), text typewriter, markup/collaboration, and stamp signature (document signing).
 PDF-XChange Viewer: Freeware viewer with free OCR, supports FDF/XFDF import/export, saving filled forms, extended markup and export to image capabilities.
 Qiqqa: Freeware PDF reader, indexer, tagger and annotator. Supports OCR and export of PDF text and images.
 Sumatra PDF: A free (GPL), open source PDF reader based on MuPDF. It also supports DjVu, XPS, CHM, Comic Book (CBR, CBT, CBZ and CB7Z) and eBook (EPUB, FB2, FB2Z, PBD, MOBI, PBR, TCR & ZFB2), TXT and image file formats (.tga, .gif, .jpg, .j2k, .png, .webp, .tiff). Supports automatic .pdfsync & .synctex reloading of PDF files so is well favoured as a LaTeX / pdfTeX viewer with forward - inverse synchronization. Using Ghost script it supports PostScript (.ps, .eps) files.
 STDU Viewer: A freeware for non-commercial usage PDF reader. It also supports DjVu, Comic Book Archive (CBR or CBZ), XPS, TIFF, TXT and image file formats.
 PDF24 Creator: The lightweight PDF24 Reader is part of the PDF24 Creator.

Mobile

Web-based

Creators 
 Collabora Online

Converters 
 Collabora Online supported formats include OpenDocument, PDF, HTML, Microsoft Office formats (DOC/DOCX/RTF, XLS/XLSX, PPT/PPTX) and others.

 Zamzar: Online file converter
 Smallpdf: Offers free (trial) online PDF conversion (PDF to other formats and vice versa)

Editors
 PDFescape: an advertising and fee supported web service to view, create forms, fill out forms, and edit PDF documents from a web browser (requires JavaScript to be enabled)
 PDFVue: a free web application that allows the user to view PDFs, comment and fill PDF forms from a web browser. Generates a watermark.
 Smallpdf: Free (trial) web-based PDF software for editing, signing, compressing, merging, splitting, rotating, unlocking and protecting PDF files.

Viewers
 A.nnotate: a web service which views PDF documents as HTML in the browser, with annotation features.
 DigiSigner: free online PDF viewer java applet with additional function to digitally sign PDF documents.
 Docstoc: a web service which allows viewing PDF documents online.
 Issuu: a web service which allows viewing PDF documents online.
 Google Docs: a web service which views PDF documents as PNG images in the browser.
 Scribd: a web service which renders PDF documents as HTML5 in the browser.
 PDF.js: A Javascript-based library, with viewer, and browser extension.
 PDFTron Systems: WebViewer. A free JavaScript viewer and annotator for self-hosting of web optimized PDFs.

References

External links

PDF
PDF